The Jhandewalan Metro Station is located on the Blue Line of the Delhi Metro.

It is near the Big Hanuman Ji statue and the temple.

The station is used by MBA for CAT coaching from T.I.ME.

Station layout

See also
List of Delhi Metro stations
Transport in Delhi

References

External links

 Delhi Metro Rail Corporation Ltd. official website 
 Delhi Metro Annual Reports
 

Delhi Metro stations
Railway stations opened in 2005
Railway stations in New Delhi district